Nigoiti is a village in the Lanchkhuti Municipality of Guria in western Georgia with the population of 615 (2014). In 1854, during the Crimean War, the Battle of Nigoiti was fought nearby between the Ottoman Empire and Russian Empire.

References

Populated places in Lanchkhuti Municipality